The year 1670 in music involved some significant events.

Events 
June – Christian Geist joins the Swedish court orchestra under Gustaf Düben.
October 14 – First performance of Molière's Le Bourgeois gentilhomme, a five-act comédie-ballet – a play intermingled with music, dance and singing – at the court of King Louis XIV of France.

Publications 
Angelo Berardi – Discorsi musicali

Classical music 
Angelo Berardi – Sinfonie a violino solo con basso continuo Libro primo, Op. 7
Maurizio Cazzati – Op. 55, a collection of sonatas
Jacques Champion de Chambonnières – Les Pieces de clavessin, Livre premier
Marc-Antoine Charpentier – O pretiosum, O salutiferum, H.245
Denis Gaultier – Pièces de luth sur trois différens modes nouveaux
Giovanni Legrenzi – Acclamationi divote, Op.10
Pavel Josef Vejvanovský –  Baletti pro tabula in C major for 2 trumpets, organ, strings (CZ-KRa  A 885)

Opera 
Ludovico Busca – L'Ippolita, Reina delle Amazzoni

Births
January 24 – William Congreve, lyricist and librettist (died 1729)
July 18 – Giovanni Bononcini, cellist and composer (died 1747)
July 19 – Richard Leveridge, singer and composer (died 1758)
September 9 – Andreas Armsdorff, composer (died 1699)
date unknown
Julie d'Aubigny ("La Maupin"), opera singer (died 1707)
Pompeo Cannicciari, Italian composer (died 1744)
Henry Eccles, English composer (died 1742)
John Christian Jacobi, composer (died 1750)
Turlough O'Carolan, harpist (died 1738)
probable
Antonio Caldara, composer (died 1736)
Johann Caspar Ferdinand Fischer, composer (died 1746)

Deaths 
April 6 – Leonora Baroni, singer, musician and composer (born 1611)
April 23 – Loreto Vittori, Italian castrato singer and composer (born c.1590)
July 18 – Giuseppe Allevi, composer (born c. 1603)
date unknown
François Du Fault, composer
Cornelis Thymenszoon Padbrué, composer (born c.1592)

 
Music
17th century in music
Music by year